Abu Mansur Wahsudan (also spelled Vahsudan) was the penultimate Rawadid amir (ruler) of Azarbaijan from 1025 to 1058/59. He is considered the most prominent ruler of his dynasty. With the assistance of his Kurdish neighbours, he initially contained the attacks of migrating Turkmen tribes, but was eventually forced to acknowledge the authority of the Seljuk ruler Tughril in 1054. He was succeeded by his son Abu Nasr Mamlan II.

Background 
Wahsudan was a son of the Rawadid amir (ruler) Abu'l-Hayja Mamlan I. Wahsudan's accession date and early reign are uncertain. According to the contemporary Armenian historian, Stephen of Taron, Abu'l-Hayja Mamlan I died in 988/89, however, he most likely confused him with another Abu'l-Hayja, who was from the Sallarid dynasty. The Ottoman historian Münejjim Bashi (d. 1702), who based his work on the now lost 12th century Ta'rikh al-Bab wa'l-Abwab, reports that Abu'l-Hayja Mamlan I died in 1001. However, coinage struck in the name of Muhammad ibn Husayn Rawad (another name of Abu'l-Hayja Mamlan I) appeared in 1002, 1009 and 1014, which indicates that he ruled for longer than reported. Another theory is that another ruler of the same name minted the coins. Münejjim Bashi further reports that Abu'l-Hayja Mamlan I was succeeded by his son Abu Nasr Husayn II, who ruled till his death in 1025. This likewise contradicts coin findings, with one struck in Wahsudan's name in 1016, which suggests that he became ruler between 1014–1016. The modern historian Andrew Peacock suggests that the Rawadid kingdom was divided between Wahsudan and Abu Nasr Husayn II, or that the latter's reign was shortlived. He adds Wahsudan may even have succeeded his father directly.

Reign 

In contrast to the other relatively obscure Rawadid amirs, Wahsudan's reign is better attested because of the preservation of the sixty panegyric qasidas (a form of poetry) composed by the Persian poet Qatran Tabrizi. Nevertheless, details of his early reign are almost unknown. At an unspecified date, Wahsudan sent a large force led by his son Abu Nasr Mamlan, who was accompanied by Qatran, against the Ispahbadh of Mughan. The latter was defeated and forced to acknowledge Rawadid authority. Abu Nasr Mamlan subsequently built a fortress in the town of Ardabil.

It was during the reign of Wahsudan that Azarbaijan experienced incursions by migrating Turkmen tribes, known as the Iraqiya. They were well received by Wahsudan, who made a marriage alliance with them to use them against his rivals, such as the Armenians. Wahsudan had an uneasy relationship with his sister's son Abu'l-Hayja ibn Rabib al-Dawla, who was the leader of the Hadhabani tribe, as well as the ruler of Urmia and the fortress of Barkari. In 1033/4, the Byzantine Empire captured the fortress at Wahsudan's urging. The Abbasid caliph al-Qa'im convinced the Rawadids to band together and recapture Barkari; they briefly reoccupied it until losing it permanently to the Byzantines. In 1037/38, a second and much stronger wave of Iraqiya led by the chiefs Buqa, Goktash, Mansur and Dana reached Azarbaijan. The Iraqiya soon began to plunder the country, sacking the city of Maragha in 1039. 

In retaliation, Wahsudan and Abu'l-Hayja ibn Rabib al-Dawla defeated the Iraqiya, who were scattered into different groups which went to Ray, Isfahan and Hamadan. Regardless, the Iraqiya continued to pose a threat to the Rawadids, as Wahsudan invited them to a banquet where he massacred them and had forty of their leaders arrested in 1040/41. As a result, most of the Iraqiya subsequently withdrew to Hakkari. In 1041/42, another group of Iraqiya reached Azarbaijan from Ray, where they had fled from the Seljuk commander Ibrahim Inal. They engaged Wahsudan in a number of battles, including one near Sarab where they suffered a heavy defeat. The Wahsudan ultimately expelled them.

The eviction of the Iraqiya from Azarbaijan gave Wahsudan the opportunity to improve his relations with the neighbouring Shaddadids, as he went to their capital of Ganja in person and visited their ruler Abu'l-Hasan Lashkari. In 1042/43, an earthquake devastated much of the capital of Tabriz, including its citadel, walls, houses, markets and most of the Rawadid palace. The Persian poet Nasir Khusraw, who visited the city four years later, reports that 40,000 inhabitants died, but that the place still continued to prosper. The later historian Ibn al-Athir (died 1232/33) reports 50,000 casualties. Wahsudan only survived the incident as he was in a garden, probably outside the city. In 1044, around 5,000 Iraqiya arrived in Mesopotamia from Azarbaijan, where they seized the town of Khuy. Between 1048–1049, the area around Tabriz was devastated by the Turkmen chieftain Hasan, who was seemingly a nephew of the Seljuk ruler Tughril. In 1054, Wahsudan was forced to submit to Tughril, who went to Tabriz in person. Tughril's name was placed in the khutba (Friday prayer), while a son of Wahsudan, possibly Abu'l-Hayja Manuchihr, was sent as a Seljuk hostage to Khurasan.

The circumstances of the transition of power between Wahsudan and his son Abu Nasr Mamlan are uncertain. According to Münejjim Bashi, Wahsudan died in 1059, but Ibn al-Athir reports that Abu Nasr Mamlan was recognised by Tughril as the ruler of Azarbaijan in 1058/59. Wahsudan also had a third son named Abu'l-Qasim Ibrahim, but nothing is known about him.

Culture 
The Rawwadids were promoters of Persian culture demonstrated by Wahsudan and Mamlan II's patronage of Qatran.

References

Sources 
 
 
 
 
 
 

11th-century monarchs in the Middle East
1059 deaths
Year of birth unknown
11th-century Kurdish people
Rawadid dynasty